State Highway 9 or Trunk Highway 9 (MN 9, TH 9) is a  state highway in west-central and northwest Minnesota, which runs from its intersection with MN 23 in New London and continues west and then north to its northern terminus at its intersection with US Highway 2 (US 2) in Fairfax Township near Crookston. This highway has two distinct segments, a north–south section and an east–west section, connected by US 75 between Doran and Breckenridge.

Route description
MN 9 serves as a north–south and east–west route between New London, Benson, Morris, Breckenridge, Barnesville, Ada, and Crookston in west-central and northwest Minnesota.

Monson Lake State Park is located west of Sunburg and west of the junction of  9 and MN 104.  The park entrance is located off MN 9 via County Road 95 (CR 95). A portion of the route passes through the Red River Valley region in northwest Minnesota.

East–west section
The eastern terminus for MN 9 is its intersection with MN 23 in New London in west-central Minnesota. The western terminus for the route is its intersection with US 75 in Doran.

North–south section
The southern terminus for MN 9 is its second intersection with US 75, immediately north of Breckenridge. The northern terminus for the route is its intersection with US 2 in Fairfax Township, immediately east of Crookston in northwest Minnesota.

History
MN 9 was authorized in 1933. At this time, it ran from US 12 in Benson northwest to US 75 at Doran. The last section  of the original MN 9 to be paved was the section between Nashua and Norcross, which was paved in 1952.  In the mid-1950s, when US 75 between Ada and Crookston was rerouted to another roadway, the MN 9 designation was extended along the former MN 82 from Breckenridge to Ada and along the former route of US 75 to its current northern terminus. This extended segment of the highway was completely paved in 1959; the last section completed was between Barnesville and US 10. In 1961, MN 9 was extended again, replacing MN 17 from Benson to New London.

Major intersections

See also

References

External links

MN 9 at The Unofficial Minnesota Highways Page

009
Transportation in Polk County, Minnesota
Transportation in Norman County, Minnesota
Transportation in Clay County, Minnesota
Transportation in Wilkin County, Minnesota
Transportation in Grant County, Minnesota
Transportation in Stevens County, Minnesota
Transportation in Swift County, Minnesota
Transportation in Kandiyohi County, Minnesota
Transportation in Pope County, Minnesota
Transportation in Traverse County, Minnesota